The XII South American Games (Spanish: XII Juegos Suramericanos Asunción 2022) was a multi-sport event held between 1–15 October 2022 in Asunción, Paraguay. The Games were organized by the South American Sports Organization, the Paraguayan Olympic Committee, the government of the Republic of Paraguay and the local National Secretary of Sports.

Bidding process

The city of Asunción, capital of Paraguay, announced its interest in hosting the 2022 South American Games. In September 2017, Camilo Pérez López Moreira, president of the Paraguayan Olympic Committee, reported that he had the endorsement of then-President Horacio Cartes to be able to present the Asunción 2022 candidacy. According to López, an investment of USD 25 million was required. Meanwhile, it was speculated that the Argentine city of Rosario would also present its candidacy.

Asunción was finally the only city that officially presented its candidacy for the 2022 South American Games before the nominations deadline, on November 17, 2019. At the Odesur assembly on December 11, 2017, it was designated as the host city unanimously. Rosario, meanwhile, was assigned as the venue for the 2021 South American Youth Games (now the 2022 South American Youth Games).

Among the venues that were designed for the organization of the event were the Paraguayan Olympic Park, the Sportivo Luqueño Club (both located in Luque), the bay of Asunción and Rakiura, while the South American Village was built in the city of Mariano Roque Alonso in an area of 17.5 hectares (although it was initially indicated that it would be in Costanera Norte).

However, the local National Secretary of Sports (SND) announced on July 27, 2019 that the country was renouncing the organization of the event. The reason given by the government was that the resources committed in the Games were destined to the construction of a new hospital in Barrio Obrero and other health projects.

On October 8, the president of Odesur and also of the Paraguayan Olympic Committee, Camilo Pérez, announced that Asunción will finally organize this edition of the South American Games.

Budget 
The capital budget of the games was cut to 180 million USD, due to budget cuts by the government. This amount was further reduced to 80 million USD.

Participating nations
The number of athletes entered by a NOC is in parentheses. 

 (592)
 (12)
 (296)
 (464)
 (539)
 (500)
 (27)
 (225)
 (16)
 (86)
 (576) (hosts)
 (374)
 (27)
 (322)
 (420)

Sports
A total of 34 sports are scheduled to be contested.29 of them are in the program of the 2023 Pan American Games scheduled for Santiago, Chile and will give nominal places for the event.  The Organizing Committee chose as optional sports: bocce, bodybuilding, futsal and beach soccer.Along this 34 sports,they chose chess and padel are being contested as exhibition/demonstration sports.

Numbers in parentheses indicate the number of medal events to be contested in each sport/discipline.

Aquatics

  

 
 

Volleyball

Calendar
The schedule was as follows:

Medal table

Venues

These are some of the venues confirmed to host the games:

 Anfiteatro José Asunción Flores – Mountain biking.
 Asunción Golf Club – Golf.
 Bahía de Asunción – Canoeing; Road cycling; Rowing.
 Bloque 1 del SND – Weightlifting; Boxing.
 Bloque 2 del SND – Judo.
 Bloque 3 del SND – Karate; Wrestling; Taekwondo.
 Bochódromo del Parque Olímpico – Boules.
 Centro Nacional de Squash – Squash.
 Club Internacional de Tenis – Tenis.
 Estadio Héroes de Curupayty – Rugby.
 Federación Paraguaya de Tenis de Mesa – Table tennis; Fencing.
 Hotel Guaraní Asunción – Bodybuilding.
  Canal de Piracema – Canoe slalom 
 Los Pynandi World Cup Stadium – Beach soccer; Beach volleyball.
 Pabellón de Gimnasia del SND – Artistic gymnastic; Rhythmic gymnastic; Trampoline gymnastic.
 Pista BMX – BMX freestyle; BMX racing.
 Pista de Atletismo del COP –  Athletics.
 Polideportivo de las Fuerzas Armadas – TBA.
 Saltos del Monday – Canoe sprint.
 SND Arena – Artistic skating.
 Stand de Tiro del COP – Shooting.
 Strike Bowling – Bowling.
 Terminal Occidental – Open water swimming; Water skiing; Triathlon.
 Velódromo del COP – Track cycling.

See also
2022 Winter Olympics
2022 Central American Games
2022 Asian Games

References

External links 
 

 
South American Games
South American Games
South American Games
South American
Multi-sport events in Paraguay
Sport in Asunción
South American Games
South American Games